Saba Park Services UK Limited formerly known as Indigo Park Services UK Limited is a parking facilities company based in Watford.  

It is owned by Infra Park S.A.S.  That is owned 37% by Ardian, 37% by Crédit Agricole and 25% by Vinci SA. The parent company was offered for sale in February 2017 with the price expected to be around 3 billion euros. It operates a parking network in more than 500 cities and 17 countries with 
530,000 parking spaces in the Iberian Peninsula, Britain and Turkey. Its earnings before interest, tax, depreciation and amortization were 71 million euros in 2016 on sales of 201 million euros.

Operations

 University Hospital of Wales, Cardiff - a 15 year contract. It made a profit of £2.8 million in 2016 from this contract, from charges and fines. 80 staff who have been fined challenged the fines in court.  The staff also claimed that just finding a space used up to an hour a day of their time and that their earnings may be insufficient to cover the fines.  In July 2017 the doctors and nurses lost the case and were required to pay £128 per ticket issued, leading to a number of them handing in their notice. The hospital employs 6000 staff but only has 1800 parking spaces. 
Ninewells Hospital- a 30 year lease.  Three nurses were ordered to pay the company more than £4,000 in September 2017 for a total of 30 unpaid fines at the hospital.
 It offers “premier parking” at most of the car parks it operates on behalf of Govia Thameslink Railway north of the Thames.
Edenbridge Town railway station
 Royal Cornwall Hospitals NHS Trust which it took over October 2022.

References

Companies based in Watford
Parking companies